The Liacouras Center is a 10,000-seat multi-purpose venue which opened in 1997 and was originally named "The Apollo of Temple". The arena was renamed in 2000 for Temple University President, Peter J. Liacouras. It is part of a $107 million, four-building complex along North Broad Street on the Temple University campus in North Philadelphia. The Liacouras Center is the largest indoor, public assembly venue in Philadelphia north of City Hall.

History 
During the 1980s, Temple basketball coach John Chaney sought to raise the profile of the men's basketball program through aggressively scheduling top-tier, out of conference opponents. Some programs, however, scoffed at the idea of playing at Temple's 3,900-seat on-campus arena, McGonigle Hall. Temple's President at the time, Peter J. Liacouras, supported the idea of a larger basketball facility in hopes of building Temple's national presence. Temple considered several locations and a site was purchased in 1988 for $7.3 million. The state of Pennsylvania awarded Temple $31.1 million in October 1992, despite disagreements between Chaney and then-City Council president John Street.

The project was approved in 1995, with a January 25, 1996 groundbreaking. Two nationally recognized architectural firms designed the building: Vitetta Group of Philadelphia, and Thompson Ventulett Stainback & Associates of Atlanta. The  venue opened in the 1997-98 season. The first game played was a 76-61 Temple win over #18 Fresno State.

The venue was originally named The Apollo of Temple. The name changed to the Liacouras Center just prior to Liacouras' retirement on February 13, 2000.

The Liacouras Center is managed by Global Spectrum, a subsidiary of Comcast-Spectacor. The Liacouras Center is Philadelphia's largest indoor venue north of City Hall and hosts home games for all of Temple men's basketball, along with some women's games. As of the end of the 2016-17 season, the Owls have amassed a 206-69 record in the building. The Esther Boyer Theater at the Liacouras Center is a small theater setup of 1,000 to 5,000 seats for more intimate presentations. The complex also houses the Independence Blue Cross Recreation Center (IBC), which includes a gym, basketball court, racquetball courts, and more. The IBC opened in the spring semester of 1998. The fourth building in the complex is a 1,200-space parking garage.

Use beyond basketball

Besides hosting Temple basketball games, the Liacouras Center is a full entertainment arena featuring concerts, family shows, Philadelphia KiXX games, Philly Roller Derby bouts, a full range of concerts, dramatic presentations, and family shows. Additionally, several high school graduations, as well as university graduations and convocation ceremonies, are held there.

On October 16, 2019, All Elite Wrestling (AEW) held its third televised professional wrestling event at the Liacouras Center, broadcast on the TNT network in the United States. AEW returned to the Liacouras Center for its two year anniversary show on October 6, 2021.

In March 2020, the Liacouras Center was transformed into a field hospital with 200 beds arranged on the court in anticipation of a surge in need due to the COVID-19 pandemic and shortages in city hospitals. At the end of April 2020, operations of the field hospital began winding down as the rate of new COVID-19 cases in Philadelphia began to decline.

Past events

Music

Rap - Hip-hop 
 50 Cent
 Fat Joe
 Fetty Wap
 Bow Wow and Omarion
 Kid Cudi
 Method Man & Redman
 Kanye West
 Wale
 Wiz Khalifa
 Big Sean
 Super Jam 2010, featuring Trey Songz and Ludacris
 T.I.
 Nelly
 Ludacris (October 2014)
 A$AP Rocky
Playboi Carti
A Boogie wit da Hoodie

Rock - Pop 
 Bob Dylan
 Phil Lesh and Friends
 Maroon 5
 John Mayer
 Counting Crows
 Natalie Merchant
 Muse
 Goo Goo Dolls
 Green Day
 R.E.M.
 Automatic Black
 Clay Aiken/Kelly Clarkson
 Of Monsters and Men
 My Chemical Romance
 Bastille
The Chainsmokers
 Bassnectar

R&B 
 Sam Smith (January 13, 2015)
 Alicia Keys
 Patti LaBelle
 Luther Vandross

Country 
 LeAnn Rimes
 Carrie Underwood with Little Big Town

Entertainment 
 Jamie Foxx
 Fat Albert (film; world premiere)
 Wheel of Fortune
 Steve Harvey
 Katt Williams
 Theresa Caputo (October 2014)
Martin Lawrence

Politics/Government 
 Barack Obama (November 2, 2014)
 Bernie Sanders (April 6, 2016)
 Barack Obama, *Joe Biden, * Josh Shapiro, and * John Fetterman
(November 5th, 2022)

Sports 
 Bernard Hopkins vs. Enrique Ornelas (December 2009)
 NCAA Women's Division I Basketball Tournament (2004; Opening Round)
 TNA Wrestling: Lockdown (2009)
 TNA Wrestling: Bound for Glory (2011)
 The Harlem Globetrotters
 U.S. Gymnastics Championships (2001)
 USA Gymnastics American Cup
 Sugar Ray Leonard Boxing
 David Reid Boxing
 Philadelphia 76ers Exhibition Game
 2017 International WFTDA Championships (roller derby)
AEW's Dynamite TV episode (October 16, 2019)
AEW's Dynamite Dynamite 2 Year Anniversary (October 6, 2021)

See also

 List of NCAA Division I basketball arenas

References

External links
 

Temple Owls basketball venues
College basketball venues in the United States
Basketball venues in Philadelphia
Boxing venues in Philadelphia
Indoor soccer venues in the United States
Gymnastics venues in the United States
Sports venues in Philadelphia
Philadelphia Big 5
Templetown, Philadelphia
University and college student recreation centers in the United States
Sports venues completed in 1997
1997 establishments in Pennsylvania
Wrestling venues in Pennsylvania